The Federation of Malaya competed at the 1956 Summer Olympics in Melbourne, Australia.  It was the first Olympic appearance by the nation, which later expanded and was renamed as Malaysia in 1963. 32 competitors, 31 men and 1 woman, took part in 13 events in 5 sports.

Athletics

Men
Track events

Women
Track event

Hockey

Men's tournament
Team roster

 Supaat Nadarajah
 Manikam Shanmuganathan
 Chuah Eng Cheng
 Philip Sankey 
 Mike Shepherdson
 Gerry Toft
 Salam Devendran
 Chua Eng Kim
 Thomas Lawrence
 Aman Ullah Karim
 Sheikh Ali Sheik Mohamed
 Hamzah Shamsuddin
 Peter van Huizen
 Freddy Vias
 Rajaratnam Selvanayagam
 Gian Singh
 Noel Arul

Group B

Ninth to twelfth classification

Shooting

Three shooters represented Malaya in 1956.

Men

Swimming

Men

Weightlifting

Men

References

External links
 Official Olympic Reports

Nations at the 1956 Summer Olympics
1956
1956 in Malayan sport